OBHS is an acronym for:
 Old Bridge High School in New Jersey, United States
 Otago Boys' High School in Dunedin, New Zealand
 Oyster Bay High School in Oyster Bay, New York